The Fourth Working Cabinet,, was an Indonesian cabinet that resulted from regrouping of the previous cabinet by President Sukarno. It consisted of three deputy prime ministers, eight coordinating ministers and 33 ministers, six ministers of state as well as 11 members heading government bodies. It was dissolved on 27 August 1964.

Composition

Cabinet Leadership
Prime Minister: Sukarno

Presidium
First Deputy Prime Minister: Subandrio
Second Deputy Prime Minister: Johannes Leimena
Third Deputy Prime Minister: Chairul Saleh

Foreign and Foreign Economic Relations Section
Coordinating Minister for the Foreign and Foreign Economic Relations Section ad interim: Subandrio
Minister of Foreign Affairs and Foreign Economic Relations: Subandrio

Justice and Home Affairs Section
Coordinating Minister for the Justice and Home Affairs Section ad interim: Wirjono Prodjodikoro
Minister of Home Affairs: Ipik Gandamana
Minister of Justice ad interim: Wirjono Prodjodikoro
Minister/Chief Justice of the Supreme Court: Wirjono Prodjodikoro
Minister/Attorney General: Kadarusman

Defense and Security Section
Coordinating Minister for the Defense and Security Section ad interim: Abdul Haris Nasution
Minister/Commander of the Army: Maj. Gen. Ahmad Yani
Minister/Commander of the Navy: Commodore R. E. Martadinata
Minister/Commander of the Air Force: Air Vice Marshal Omar Dani
Minister/Chief of the National Police: Insp. Gen. Soekarno Djojonegoro

Finance Section
Coordinating Minister for the Finance Section: Sumarno
Minister of Supplies, costs and Oversight: Sumarno
Minister of State Budget Affairs: Arifin Harahap
Minister of Central Bank Affairs: Jusuf Muda Dalam
Minister of Control of Banks and Private Capital: Suharto

Development Section
Coordinating Minister for the Development Section: Chairul Saleh
Minister of Basic Industries and Mining: Chairul Saleh
Minister of People's Industry: Maj. Gen. Azis Saleh
Minister of Public Works and Power: Maj. Gen. Suprajogi
Minister of Agriculture: Sadjarwo
Minister of National Research: Soedjono Djuned Pusponegoro
Minister of Labor: Ahem Erningpradja
Minister of National development Planning: Suharto
Minister of Veterans' Affairs and Demobilization: Brig. Gen. Sambas Atmadinata

Distribution Section
Coordinating Minister for the Distribution Section: Johannes Leimena
Minister of Trade: Adam Malik
Minister of Transmigration, Cooperatives and the Development of Villagers: Achmadi
Minister of Land Transportation and Post, Telecommunications and Tourism: Lt. Gen. Hidajat
Minister of Maritime Transportation: Brig. Gen. Ali Sadikin
Minister of Air Transportation: Col. R. Iskander

Welfare Section
Coordinating Minister for the Public Welfare Section: Muljadi Djojomartono
Minister of Religious Affairs: Sjaifuddin Zuchri
Minister of Social Affairs: Rusiah Sardjono
Minister of Health: Maj. Gen. Dr. Satrio
Minister of Basic Education & Culture: Prijono
Minister of Higher Education & Science: Thojib Hadiwidjaja
Minister of Sport: Maladi
Minister of Relations with Religious Scholars: Fatah Jasin

Relations with the People Section
Coordinating Minister for the Relations with the People Section: Ruslan Abdulgani
Minister of Information: Ruslan Abdulgani
Minister of Relations with the People's Representative Council/People's Consultative Assembly/Supreme Advisory Council/National Planning Agency: W. J. Rumambi
Minister/Secretary General of the National Front: Sudibjo

Presidential Advisory Ministers
Presidential/Prime Ministerial Advisory Minister of funds and forces: Notohamiiprodjo
State Minister Assigned to the President: Iwa Kusumasumantri
Minister and Military Adviser to the Indonesian President: Lt. Gen. S. Surjadarma

Leaders of State Bodies Ministers with Ministerial Status
Chairman of the Provisional People's Consultative Assembly: Chairul Saleh
Speaker of the Mutual Assistance People's Representative Council: Arudji Kartawinata
Deputy Chairman of the Supreme Advisory Council: Sartono
Deputy Chairman of the Provisional People's Consultative Assembly: Ali Sastroamidjojo
Deputy Chairman of the Provisional People's Consultative Assembly: Idham Chalid
Deputy Chairman of the Provisional People's Consultative Assembly: Dipa Nusantara Aidit
Deputy Chairman of the Provisional People's Consultative Assembly: Brig. Gen. Wilujo Puspojudo
Deputy Speaker of the Mutual Assistance People's Representative Council: I. G. G. Subamia
Deputy Speaker of the Mutual Assistance People's Representative Council: M. H. Lukman
Deputy Speaker of the Mutual Assistance People's Representative Council: Mursalin Daeng Mamangung
Deputy Speaker of the Mutual Assistance People's Representative Council: Achmad Sjaichu

References
 

Cabinets of Indonesia
1964 disestablishments in Indonesia
Cabinets disestablished in 1964

id:Kabinet Kerja III